Giridhari Yadav (born 14 April 1961) is an Indian politician. He is currently a member of the Lok Sabha. He represents Banka and is a member of the Janata Dal (United) political party.

Yadav has been elected thrice into the Lok sabha and four times in Bihar Legislative Assembly. He was elected to Bihar Legislative Assembly and 11th lok Sabha with Janata Dal, while he was in RJD he was elected to Bihar Vidhan Sabha and 14th Lok sabha. Yadav joined JD(U) in 2010 and has been elected twice to Bihar Vidhan Sabha with JDU(U) and 17th Lok Sabha.

Early life 
Giridhari Yadav was born on 14 April 1961 in Banka, Bihar. His father, Dhano Yadav, was a school teacher in Indian Railways; his mother is Jagti Devi. He is one of seven children of Dhano and Jagti.

Yadav earned a B.A. degree in history from Bhagalpur University in 1982. Then he moved to Madhya Pradesh to pursue postgraduate studies at DHG University, Sagar where he obtained M.A. in History and later obtained LLB in Law from Bhagalpur University at the age of 33. Yadav married Sumitra Devi in 1976 and has one daughter and two sons.

Early career 
Giridhari Yadav was a history student in Madhya Pradesh and started his political career in Sagar, Madhya Pradesh as a youth co-ordinator in Indian Youth Congress in the Rajiv Gandhi Government (1983-1985). He was said to be close to former chief minister Arjun Singh, B.R. Yadav and Santosh Sahu.

Political career
Giridhari Yadav belongs to a socialist class of politicians. He was in Indian Youth Congress during Rajiv Gandhi's tenure and was associated with the likes of V. P. Singh. Yadav went back to Bihar after campaigning in Madhya Pradesh Assembly elections, in August, 1994 and worked as a party worker for Janata Dal. In 1995, he got the party ticket to contest from Katoria, Bihar in the Bihar Legislative Assembly elections. After Yadav's triumphant victory in Bihar Legislative Assembly elections, he went on to win the 11th Lok Sabha for Banka, Bihar.

In 1997, Yadav was one of seventeen Lok Sabha MPs to form Rashtriya Janata Dal(RJD) as a break away party from Janata Dal in New Delhi. He lost to Digvijay Singh in 12th Lok Sabha elections on RJD ticket by less than 1%  of total votes. Yadav got elected as MLA for second time from Katoria, Bihar in 2000, and in 1999 came close to winning 13th Lok Sabha as an independent candidate losing only by a margin of 2% of total votes.

In 2004, Yadav successfully defeated Digvijay Singh and was elected to 14th Lok Sabha. After being denied a party ticket by RJD while being a sitting MP, Giridhari Yadav had a fall out with Lalu Prasad Yadav. In 2010, Yadav joined Janata Dal (United) and was elected to Bihar Legislative Assembly from Belhar, Bihar. He became the General Secretary of JD(U) in 2014. Yadav resigned from the post in 2015 after being issued a notice for mingling with alliance RJD leader Mohd. Shahabuddin. He won his fourth Bihar Legislative Assembly in 2015 and currently serves as MLA for Belhar, Bihar.

Positions held

References

External links
 Home Page on the Parliament of India's Website
 RJD MLAs clash in Banka town
  Digvijay, Girdhari bank on Banka

1961 births
Living people
People from Jamui
India MPs 2004–2009
Indian National Congress politicians
People from Banka, Bihar
Bihar MLAs 1995–2000
Lok Sabha members from Bihar
Bihar MLAs 2000–2005
Janata Dal (United) politicians
Rashtriya Janata Dal politicians
Janata Dal politicians
India MPs 1996–1997
India MPs 2019–present
Tilka Manjhi Bhagalpur University alumni